Christopher Scott Cherot is an American film director best known for Hav Plenty (1997), a true story that he wrote, edited, produced, acted in and directed.

Projects
Mr. Cherot also directed G, loosely based on The Great Gatsby, as well as The Male Groupie (2004), Andre Royo's Big Scene (2004), and the BET reality series College Hill (2004), an urban version of MTV's The Real World, and edited the first season of LOGO's Noah's Arc (2006).

External links

African-American film directors
American film directors
Year of birth missing (living people)
Living people
Place of birth missing (living people)
21st-century African-American people